Hawkesbury River Ferries was a ferry and cruise boat operator based at Brooklyn on the Hawkesbury River in the northern suburbs of Sydney, Australia. The company operated the Dangar Island Ferry and the widely advertised Australia's last Riverboat Postman cruise, as well as other cruises and charters.

The company went into liquidation on 29 March 2012. After a period where temporary arrangements were made to keep these two services going, contracts have now been awarded to other ferry operators to continue these services on a permanent basis. The Riverboat Postman service is now being run by Hawkesbury Cruises. The Dangar Island and Little Wobby services are now being run by Banksia Ferry Charters.

The Dangar Island Ferry connects Brooklyn to Dangar Island and Little Wobby Beach, both of which are communities that have no road access, and which rely entirely on river transport. The ferry operates seven days a week and provides an irregular, but roughly hourly, service to Dangar Island, with some services continuing to Little Wobby Beach.

Australia's last Riverboat Postman operates under contract to Australia Post and delivers the mail to isolated homes and communities along the Hawkesbury River between Brooklyn and Spencer. However it also carries passengers, thus providing a 3 to 4 hour long tourist oriented river cruise. The service operates once a day on weekdays only.

Both services depart a wharf in Brooklyn adjacent to Hawkesbury River railway station.

References

External links
Riverboat Postman
Hawkesbury Cruises
Banksia Ferry Charters

Ferry transport in Sydney
Ferry companies of New South Wales
Hawkesbury River
Ferries of New South Wales